Ernest Barfo (born 19 September 1992), is a Ghanaian footballer who plays for Sitra Club as a forward.

References

External links
 

1992 births
Living people
Ghanaian footballers
Ghanaian expatriate footballers
Asswehly S.C. players
Bechem United F.C. players
Al-Nasr SC (Kuwait) players
Al-Tai FC players
Chabab Ghazieh SC players
Yangon United F.C. players
Defence Force F.C. players
Ghana Premier League players
Kuwait Premier League players
Saudi First Division League players
Lebanese Premier League players
Myanmar National League players
Expatriate footballers in Libya
Expatriate footballers in Kuwait
Expatriate footballers in Saudi Arabia
Expatriate footballers in Lebanon
Expatriate footballers in Myanmar
Expatriate footballers in Ethiopia
Ghanaian expatriate sportspeople in Libya
Ghanaian expatriate sportspeople in Kuwait
Ghanaian expatriate sportspeople in Saudi Arabia
Ghanaian expatriate sportspeople in Lebanon
Ghanaian expatriate sportspeople in Ethiopia
Association football forwards
Libyan Premier League players